William Stirton (1893-1947) was an Australian rugby league footballer who played in the 1910s and 1920s.  He played five-eighth for Glebe Dirty Reds in four seasons between 1919 and 1923.

Background
Stirton was born in Dubbo, New South Wales.

Playing career
Stirton made his debut for Glebe against Western Suburbs in Round 6 1919 scoring a try in an 8–5 victory.  Stirton played in Glebe's 1922 NSWRL grand final loss against North Sydney which Norths won in convincing fashion 35–3 at the Sydney Cricket Ground.

He died at Newtown, New South Wales in 1947.

References

1893 births
1947 deaths
Australian rugby league players
Glebe rugby league players
Rugby league players from Dubbo